UCL Pi Media is the oldest and largest student journalism society at University College London Union. Initially launched as a newspaper in 1946  and named after former Provost David Pye, it now publishes on three platforms: Pi Online, Pi Magazine and PiTV. 

Pi Media'''s contribution to student journalism has been recognised both within UCL and by other media outlets. Pi Magazine was shortlisted for 'Magazine of the Year' at The Guardian Student Media Awards in 2009  and was named Best Publication at the Students' Union UCL Arts Awards in 2012, 2013, 2016 and 2020.

HistoryPi Media was originally launched as a newspaper in 1946, named Pi in honour of the University's Provost, Sir David Pye. In the aftermath of World War II, there was strong popular support amongst UCL students and Union officials for a community project that would bind together the rapidly expanding campus. The newspaper was conceived as a fortnightly news-sheet, written and published internally by UCL students. 

The founding editor was Richard Lubbock, a first-year medic, who modelled the four-page broadsheet after the style of an American high school newspaper. The purpose was to provide news and entertainment for students, and journalistic experience for the editorial team.

The paper was popular, charging a small fee for each issue. Though the initial focus was on student politics, as the paper recruited a more diverse base of writers and journalists, new areas began to receive attention. The newspaper's popularity among students was driven by its coverage of sports, academic discourse and regular interviews with London's public figures. Pi drew favourable comparisons with other heavyweight student newspapers, such as the London School of Economics Beaver. Pi Squared was launched alongside the magazine in October 2006 as a sister publication in newspaper form. In December 2012, following concerns that internal competition between the magazine and the newspaper was mutually harmful, the decision was made by the editorial board to discontinue Pi Squared.

In May 2007, the society constitutionally renamed  as Pi Media to take into account its expansion into other media formats.

Former contributors 

TodayPi Media's content is spread across three different platforms: Pi Online, Pi Magazine and PiTV. Pi Online is the society's fastest-growing platform which regularly publishes submissions from student writers across six sections: News, Opinion, Features, Science, Lifestyle and Culture. Topics include campus news, student politics, investigations,  environmental features, student life advice and coverage of London's cultural activities. Three editors are appointed per section to support the Editors-In-Chief.Pi Magazine is published biannually and each issue is curated around a specific theme. In recent years, the themes have included "Balance", "Empowerment" and UCL itself. The magazine contains the same sections as Pi Online, with two articles per section. The magazine is distributed for free around the UCL campus, including UCL Union bars, departmental common rooms and libraries. Although Pi Magazine is primarily available in print form, online copies of the latest issues are available through the society's website. Pi Magazine commissions art and photography from creatives within the UCL student body.PiTV is the broadcasting arm of Pi Media. It produces a range of video projects, from short documentaries, travel diaries and the Backstage Pass series, to student news coverage, political interviews and UCL Students’ Union investigations. 

In recent years, Pi Media has conducted interviews with well-known figures such as Desmond Tutu, Elijah Wood,  Nigel Farage,  Dominic Raab MP,  Rory Stewart,  and David Runciman.

Committee structure
Unlike many other student publications, Pi Media'' does not have a paid full-time sabbatical editor. Students are elected to the Committee at the Annual General Meeting (AGM) in March. Any positions that become vacant throughout the year are filled at an Extraordinary General Meeting (EGM).

External links
Official website
PiTV

References 

Monthly magazines published in the United Kingdom
News magazines published in the United Kingdom
Student magazines published in the United Kingdom
British student media groups
Clubs and societies of University College London
Biweekly magazines published in the United Kingdom
Free magazines
Magazines published in London
Magazines established in 1947
Publications established in 1945